Jeff Myers (born August 11, 1977) is an American composer.

Early life
Born and raised in Fremont, California, Myers attended San Jose University (earning a Bachelor of Music degree), the Eastman School of Music (earning a Master of Arts degree), and the University of Michigan (earning a Doctor of Musical Arts degree while studying composition under Pulitzer Prize and Grammy Award-winning composer and pianist William Bolcom and Grammy Award-winning composer Michael Daugherty).

Career
In 2011, Grammy Award-winning violinist Hilary Hahn invited composers to submit pieces for inclusion on her album In 27 Pieces: The Hilary Hahn Encores Album. Out of over 400 submissions, Hahn chose Myers' piece The Angry Birds of Kauai to perform as the 27th and final track. The album was released in 2013.

Myers' work has been presented at such venues as Carnegie Hall, the Library of Congress, Walt Disney Concert Hall, Kimmel Center, Darmstadt, Het Muziekgebouw aan ‘t IJ, Bard College, the Institute for Advanced Study, and (Le) Poisson Rouge.

Noted collaborators and commissioners include the New York City Opera, Beth Morrison Projects, Orchestre national de Lorraine, the Ann Arbor Symphony Orchestra, the University of Michigan Symphonic Band, Transit, The JACK Quartet, the PRISM Quartet, pianist Ralph van Raat, pipa virtuoso Yang Jing, violinist Yuki Numata, hornist Laura Klock, tenor William Hite, librettist Royce Vavrek, and librettist Quincy Long.

References

External links
Jeff Myers' official site

1970 births
20th-century American composers
20th-century American male musicians
20th-century classical composers
21st-century American composers
21st-century American male musicians
21st-century classical composers
American classical composers
American contemporary classical composers
American film score composers
American male classical composers
Eastman School of Music alumni
Living people
American male film score composers
People from Fremont, California
San Jose State University alumni
University of Michigan School of Music, Theatre & Dance alumni